Luperosaurus cumingii, also known commonly as Cuming's flapped-legged gecko and the Philippine wolf gecko, is a species of lizard in the family Gekkonidae. The species is endemic to southern Luzon in the Philippines.

Etymology
The specific name, cumingii, is in honor of English naturalist Hugh Cuming.

Habitat

Behavior
L. cumingii is arboreal, living in the forest canopy.

Reproduction
L. cumingii is oviparous.

References

Further reading
Boulenger GA (1885). Catalogue of the Lizards in the British Museum (Natural History). Second Edition. Volume I. Geckonidæ .... London: Trustees of the British Museum (Natural History). (Taylor and Francis, printers). xii + 436 pp. + Plates I–XXXII. (Luperosaurus cumingii, pp. 181–182 + Plate XV, figures 2 & 2a).
Gray JE (1845). Catalogue of the Lizards in the Collection of the British Museum. London: Trustees of the British Museum (Edward Newman, printer). xxviii + 289 pp. ("Luperosaurus Cumingii [sic]", new species, p. 163).
Taylor EH (1922). The Lizards of the Philippine Islands. Manila: Government of the Philippine Islands, Department of Agriculture and Natural Resources, Bureau of Science. Publication No. 17. 269 pp. + Plates 1–22. (Luperosaurus cumingii, pp. 86–87 + Plate 4, figures 1 & 1a).

Luperosaurus
Reptiles of the Philippines
Endemic fauna of the Philippines
Fauna of Luzon
Reptiles described in 1845
Taxa named by John Edward Gray